Shankarrao  may refer to 

 Shankarrao Bajirao Patil, Indian politician.
 Shankarrao Chavan, Indian politician.
 Shankarrao Deo, Indian politician.
 Shankarrao Gadakh, Indian politician.
 Shankarrao Godambe , Indian cricketer.
 Shankarrao Mohite-Patil, Indian politician.
 Shankarrao Salvi, Indian kabaddi player
 Shivajirao Shankarrao Deshmukh, Indian politician.
 Shankarrao Butte Patil Vidyalaya , Junnar, school in Maharasthra
 Dr. Shankarrao Chavan Government Medical College, in Nanded.

Hindu given names
Indian masculine  given names